Beneath the Dark Crystal is a 2018 comic book limited series that is a sequel to the 2017 series The Power of the Dark Crystal.

Conception
It continues Thurma and Kensho's story that began in the series The Power of the Dark Crystal.

Plot

Kensho arrives at the Crystal Castle where he once was an acolyte and has been asked to become Thra's leader. However, he feels that before accepting the position, he must face the mistakes of the past. Meanwhile, the realm of Mithra that is below Thra is being reconstructed by the newly crowned Ember Queen Thurma, whose rule is challenged when evidence is discovered that another Fireling has a competing claim to the throne.

Reception
The comic received a mostly positive reception from critics, with an 8.4/10 average review.

References

2018 comics debuts
Boom! Studios titles
The Dark Crystal
Comics based on films